Mary Lea Johnson Richards (August 20, 1926 – May 3, 1990) was an American heiress, entrepreneur, and Broadway producer. She was a granddaughter of Robert Wood Johnson I (co-founder of Johnson & Johnson), and of Bermudan politician, soldier, and lawyer, Colonel Thomas Melville Dill. She was the first baby to appear on a Johnson's baby powder label.

Early life 
Johnson was born in New Brunswick, New Jersey. Her father was John Seward Johnson I, and her mother was Ruth Dill, the sister of actress Diana Dill; she was therefore ma first cousin of actor Michael Douglas. Johnson grew up with five siblings: Elaine Johnson, John Seward Johnson II, Diana Melville Johnson, Jennifer Underwood Johnson, and James Loring "Jimmy" Johnson. She was sexually abused by her father from age nine to fifteen. Her parents divorced around 1937, and her father remarried two years later, producing two half siblings, including Jimmy Johnson, which made her an aunt of film director Jamie Johnson. Johnson graduated from the Masters School in Dobbs Ferry, N.Y., and the New York Academy of Dramatic Arts.

Career 
Johnson was a founder and partner of Producer Circle, a film and theater production company, which produced Broadway shows such as Sweeney Todd, and Broadway producer.

Personal life
Johnson was excluded from her father's will, which left the bulk of his fortune to Barbara Piasecka Johnson, her father's wife and former chambermaid. She and her siblings sued on grounds that their father wasn't mentally competent at the time he signed the will. It was settled out of court, and the children were granted about 12% of the fortune. During the largest inheritance battle in history, it was revealed that Johnson was a victim of incest.

Johnson's first marriage was to William Ryan, a press agent turned farmer. Before they divorced, the pair had six children: Eric Ryan, Seward Ryan, Hillary Ryan, Quentin Ryan, Roderick Newbold Ryan, and Alice Ryan Marriott.

In 1972, she married Dr. Victor D'Arc, a psychiatrist, whom she met while seeking treatment for her son's drug addiction. In 1976, she publicly declared that her estranged husband and his homosexual lover had hired hitmen to have her murdered. Johnson, who was living with gay Broadway producer Marty Richards, hired a bodyguard, who was beaten almost to death during a break-in that almost killed Johnson and Richards. Subsequently, the Bronx D.A's office made a case, and opened an investigation. No charges were brought, and the pair divorced in 1978.

Johnson's third marriage would be to Richards, and last until her death. Her family had a twelve-year-long court battle regarding her husband's eligibility for a share of the Johnson & Johnson fortune. The court ruled in favor of Richards.

In 1990, Johnson died of liver cancer at the age of 63. The NYU Mary Lea Johnson Richards Organ Transplantation Center is named after her.

See also
 Johnson v. Johnson (1988)
 Undue Influence: The Epic Battle for the Johnson & Johnson Fortune (1993)

References

Mary Lea
1990 deaths
1926 births
People from New Brunswick, New Jersey
American socialites
Deaths from liver cancer
Deaths from cancer in Pennsylvania
Schuyler family
The Masters School people